The Department of Industry, Commerce & Enterprises of West Bengal is a Bengal government department, mainly responsible for the functions relating to promotion, regulation and development of large and medium scale industries and trade and commerce in West Bengal.

The ministerial team is headed by the Cabinet Minister for Commerce & Industries, currently Partha Chatterjee. The Cabinet Minister may be supported by Ministers of State. Civil servants are assigned to them to manage the ministers' office and ministry.

Previous heads of the department include:
 Dr. Kanailal Bhattacharyya (1977-1993)
 Jyoti Basu (1993-2006)
 Amit Mitra (2011-2021)
 Partha Chatterjee (2021-2022)

References 

Government of West Bengal
Economy of West Bengal
Government departments of West Bengal
West Bengal
West Bengal
State industries departments of India